The Boy Scouts of Manchukuo ( Mǎnzhōuguó Tóngzǐ Tuán Liánméng) was a Scouting association of Manchukuo. The Japanese military seized Manchuria in 1931, created the puppet government of Manchukuo in 1932, and controlled it until 1945. The Manchukuo government also set up Japanese-style Scouting in schools, which included para-military training.

Background
In February 1937, Isamu Takeshita was appointed head of the Boy Scouts of Japan, the Sea Scouts, and the YMCA, as part of the general militarization of Japanese sports and athletics taking place at that time. Japanese military authorities did not consistently encourage the Scouting movement in occupied territories. Where local conditions were favorable, authorities would permit local Scouting or introduce Japanese-style Scouting, or Shōnendan, and sometimes even made this compulsory. On the other hand, where conditions were not favorable, and anti-Japanese sentiments were likely to be nurtured through Scouting, the authorities would prohibit it entirely.

Japanese military leaders banned Scouting for Chinese boys in occupied China by 1937, however they encouraged Japanese-style Scouting (少年團 Shōnendan) in Manchuria. In 1938 membership in the Concordia Shōnendan (協和少年團) was made compulsory for young people between 10 and 15 years old. Alternately styled the Manchukuo Boys Corps, Manchuria Boy Scout Organization, and the Manchuria League of Boy Scouts, the Scouts used the Scout motto of the existing Scouts of China, "智、勇、仁" (Wisdom, Courage, Benevolence), and Scout court of honor ceremonies were held at Confucian shrines.

Emblem 

The elaborate emblem incorporated the Flag of Manchukuo, as well as the dragons from the Manchu Qing Dynasty crossing in an "x" pattern.
According to the Document of the Explanation of National Flag issued by the state council of Manchukuo on February 24, 1933, the colors on the flag represented the four directions and center. The Study of Manchukuo National Flag published by state council of Manchukuo later also gave a representative based on Wu Xing.
 
 Yellow represented the center, symbolizes the rule of emperor of four directions and virtue of Ren in Confucianism, also Earth in Five Elements
 Red represented the South, symbolizes passion and courage, also Fire in Five Elements
 Blue represented the East, symbolizes youthfulness and holiness, also Wood in Five Elements
 White represented the West, symbolizes purity and justice, also Gold in Five Elements
 Black represented the North, symbolizes will and determination, also Water in Five Elements

The colors also represented the five major peoples in Manchukuo:

 Yellow represented the Manchu people
 Red represented the Japanese (Yamato) people 
 Blue represented the Han Chinese 
 White represented the Mongol people 
 Black represented the Korean people

Russian Scouting in China and Manchuria 1922–1947
Russian Scouts fleeing Bolshevism followed White Russian émigrés from 1917 to 1922 through Vladivostok to the east into Manchuria and south into central China, where very large groups of Russian Scouts came into being in cities such as Harbin, Tientsin and Shanghai.

See also
 Scouts of China

References

Youth organizations established in 1932
Scouting and Guiding in China
Scouting in Japan
Manchukuo